Salix tarraconensis is a species of willow in the family Salicaceae. It is endemic to Spain, where it grows in subalpine scree at 500–1400 m altitude in Tarragona and Castellon.

It is a deciduous small shrub growing to 1 m tall. The leaves are alternate, 5–15 mm long and 2–5 mm broad, with a very finely serrated margin; they are green above, and paler below with short whitish hairs.

References

Description of Salix tarraconensis
See photos of Salix tarraconensis

tarraconensis
Flora of Spain
Critically endangered plants
Taxonomy articles created by Polbot